David A. Schneider (born September 9, 1957) is a Canadian farmer and politician who was elected in the 2015 Alberta general election to the Legislative Assembly of Alberta as a member of the Wildrose Party to represent the electoral district of Little Bow.

Electoral history

2015 general election

References

Living people
1957 births
Farmers from Alberta
Wildrose Party MLAs
21st-century Canadian politicians
United Conservative Party MLAs